Joseph Edward Beninati (born November 14, 1965) is an American sportscaster who serves as the television play-by-play announcer for the National Hockey League's Washington Capitals. Along with Capitals television color analyst Craig Laughlin and "Inside the Glass" reporter Alan May, he provides Capitals game coverage for NBC Sports Washington. Beninati has been with the Washington Capitals since 1994. When not behind the microphone for the Capitals, he's often heard as the play-by-play voice of Men and Women's Lacrosse on ESPNU and The Big Ten Network (BTN). Beninati has done freelance announcing for ESPN, ESPNU, Westwood One, WFAN as well as being one of the prominent hockey voices on Versus (now NBCSN). Before his time with NBC Sports and the Capitals, he covered the Providence Bruins; the AHL system of the Boston Bruins.

Biography

Early life and college
Beninati grew up on Long Island, listening to Marv Albert broadcasting Knicks and Rangers games. He attended Bowdoin College, where he still holds the school record for saves in a season (263) by a lacrosse goaltender.

Broadcasting
Beninati started broadcasting when he was injured playing hockey and some friends talked him into appearing on the school's radio station, WBOR. The following year, he began doing play-by-play of local high school events. He later served as a sports information director. Out of college, he was hired to broadcast American Hockey League games, where he rode buses for 5 years.

Other sports
In addition to ice hockey coverage, occasionally he's heard as play-by-play for Men and Women's Lacrosse on ESPNU and The Big Ten Network where he also provides play-by-play coverage for College football ACC and CAA sporting events. 

Beninati has also filled in for coverage of the Baltimore Orioles and Washington Wizards along with the Washington Mystics.

References

External links
 Profile at Washington Capitals
 Profile at NBC Sports Washington

1965 births
Living people
American Hockey League broadcasters
American television sports announcers
Baltimore Orioles announcers
Bowdoin College alumni
College hockey announcers in the United States
College basketball announcers in the United States
College football announcers
Lacrosse announcers
Major League Baseball broadcasters
National Basketball Association broadcasters
National Hockey League broadcasters
National Football League announcers
Major League Lacrosse announcers
People from Long Island
Washington Capitals announcers
Washington Mystics announcers
Washington Wizards announcers
Women's National Basketball Association announcers